The Children and Young Persons (Care and Protection) Act 1998 is a law in New South Wales that relates to the guardianship and care of children and young people. 

The Reportable Conduct Scheme is operated under this act. The Reportable Conduct Scheme is to help ensure employers respond appropriately to allegations against employees in schools and industries working with children.

See also
 Children's Court of New South Wales

External links
 Austlii - Children and Young Persons (Care and Protection) Act 1998

1998 in Australian law
New South Wales legislation
Children's rights in Australia
Youth in Australia
Australian family law
1990s in New South Wales